Archie Kemp (18 October 1925 – 20 September 1949) was an Australian boxer from Melbourne who died in the ring while fighting against Jack Hassen for the Australian Lightweight title.

Kemp was carried from the ring on a stretcher and did not regain consciousness, dying of a cerebral haemorrhage.  The referee refused to stop the fight.

Kemp's death prompted political agitation to establish greater controls over boxing.

References

External links
 
 Image of Archie Kemp

1925 births
1949 deaths
Accidental deaths in New South Wales
Australian male boxers
Boxers from Melbourne
Deaths due to injuries sustained in boxing
Lightweight boxers
Sport deaths in Australia